Birx [bəːrks] is a surname. Notable people with the surname include:

Deborah Birx (born 1956), American physician and diplomat
Donald Birx, American physicist and academic administrator
H. James Birx (born 1941), American anthropologist

See also
Birks (surname)
Brix (disambiguation)